Lucie Anastassiou (born 10 January 1993) is a French sport shooter. She won the silver medal in the women's skeet event at the 2019 European Games held in Minsk, Belarus. In 2015, she won, alongside Anthony Terras, the bronze medal in the mixed skeet at the European Games held in Baku, Azerbaijan.

She represented France at the 2020 Summer Olympics in Tokyo, Japan.

References

External links 
 

Living people
1993 births
Sportspeople from La Rochelle
French female sport shooters
Skeet shooters
European Games silver medalists for France
European Games bronze medalists for France
European Games medalists in shooting
Shooters at the 2015 European Games
Shooters at the 2019 European Games
Shooters at the 2020 Summer Olympics
Olympic shooters of France